Futebol Clube do Porto is a Portuguese sports club based in Porto that is best known for its professional football team playing in the country's top-tier division, the Primeira Liga. Founded in 1893, the club soon entered a period of inactivity until its revival in 1906 by a group of people led by future president José Monteiro da Costa. The following year, Monteiro da Costa invited Adolphe Cassaigne, a Frenchman, to become the football team's first official head coach, replacing Italian player-coach Catullo Gadda.

As of the end of the 2019–20 season, Porto have had 70 managers of 16 nationalities, eight of which assumed caretaking roles. A total of 30 managers completed at least one season with the club, and 28 won at least one title. Hungary's József Szabó is Porto's most successful manager with 12 titles, including 10 regional championships. Excluding regional honours, the most successful manager is Sérgio Conceição, with nine titles. Tomislav Ivić and André Villas-Boas share the club record for most titles in a single season, with four.

The current manager is Sérgio Conceição, a former club player and Portuguese international, who succeeded Nuno Espírito Santo at the end of the 2016–17 season.

History

1906–48: First coach and Hungarian era 

Following the club's rebirth in 1906, Catullo Gadda, who won the Italian title with Milan in 1901, assumed the team's orientation as a player-coach and is historically considered Porto's first-ever manager. The following year, club president José Monteiro da Costa invited Adolphe Cassaigne, a Frenchman who worked with local school football teams, to become Porto's first full-time manager. Cassaigne led the team to victories in the 1914–15 Campeonato do Porto and the 1922 Campeonato de Portugal, the club's first regional and national titles. Ahead of the 1922–23 season, Cassaigne was succeeded by Akös Teszler, who signed the first professional coaching contract in Portuguese football. Under the Hungarian's leadership, Porto won five successive regional championship titles and secured their second Campeonato de Portugal in 1924–25. 

At the end of the 1926–27 season, Teszler abandoned the club; one of his players, Alexandre Cal, took over the team temporarily and secured another regional title. Cal gave way to another Hungarian manager, József Szabó, who would win more titles for the club (10) than any other after him. He won a record eight consecutive Campeonato do Porto titles – raising the club's tally to 21 in 23 seasons – and led the club in an unbeaten 1931–32 campaign that secured both regional and national titles. The 1934–35 season saw the birth of the Primeira Liga, a nationwide competition contested in a home-and-away round-robin format; Porto were the inaugural winners, ahead of Sporting CP and Benfica. Szabó left Porto after three matches into the 1936–37 Primeira Liga. Two other Hungarian coaches – Mihály Siska, a former club goalkeeper, and Magyar Ferenc, who inflicted heavy defeats upon Sporting CP (10–1), Belenenses (9–1) and Braga (11–0) – took charge until the end of the season, but failed to win a trophy. Magyar's successor was Austrian coach François Gutkas, who continued Porto's regional dominance with a 19th title, and won the club's fourth and final Campeonato de Portugal in 1937. Siska returned the following season; in his five-season tenure, Porto collected three more regional titles and won two consecutive league titles for the first time (1938–39 and 1939–40). 

For the 1942–43 season, Porto hired Lippo Hertzka, a Hungarian manager who had won the La Liga with Real Madrid and three consecutive league titles with Benfica. Although successful in the regional championship, Hertzka performed poorly at national level. In three years, Porto never finished top three in the league, and in his first season, the club had its second-worst league placing ever (seventh). During this period, Porto also suffered their heaviest defeat against Benfica, 12–2. Hertzka was replaced by Szabó, but his second spell with Porto was less successful, winning only two regional titles. Midway through the 1947–48 pre-season, Szabó resigned and Porto asked former player Carlos Nunes to temporarily assume the head coach position. Before the beginning of the season, Porto hired Eladio Vaschetto, a retired Argentine player with no previous coaching experience. Vaschetto's biggest achievement was a 3–2 win over English champions Arsenal in a friendly match played on 6 May 1948, which was immortalised by the colossal Taça Arsenal (Arsenal Cup).

1948–76: First double and title droughts 

After Vaschetto's exit in the summer of 1948, Porto had ten coaches in a period of seven years – including Vaschetto again, who returned for the first half of the 1951–52 season – but none were able to bring any silverware for the club. The lack of trophies was accentuated with the abolition of the regional championship in 1947, which Porto had dominated with 30 wins in 34 seasons. The club returned to winning ways in the 1955–56 season, under the orientation of its first Brazilian coach, Dorival Knippel, better known as Yustrich. The 1955–56 Primeira Divisão title was secured through a head-to-head tiebreak with Benfica, after both teams finished with the same points. The following month, Yustrich guided Porto to its first Taça de Portugal title, securing thus the club's first double. The Brazilian left Porto soon after, but returned a year later to replace his compatriot Flávio Costa, after a trophyless season.

Yustrich left Porto definitively after failing to win the 1957–58 league, but his successor and countryman, Otto Bumbel, took the team to the Taça de Portugal final, where they defeated Benfica. Bumbel led Porto in the first eight matches of the 1958–59 Primeira Divisão, but after two successive draws, he was replaced by Béla Guttmann. The experienced Hungarian coach won the club's fifth league title by a one-goal margin over Benfica, but could not overcome them in the Taça de Portugal final. The following season, Guttmann moved to Benfica, where he would win two consecutive European Cup titles. After his exit, Porto entered another long period of silverware drought, despite the signing of experienced and successful coaches such as Ferdinand Daučík (Spanish champion with Barcelona and Atlético Madrid) and Otto Glória (Taça de Portugal winner with Benfica and Belenenses).

For the 1966–67 season, Porto brought in its former captain and Portuguese international José Maria Pedroto. He would serve the club as head coach on three separate spells and become the coach with the most official games for Porto. Most importantly for the club, Pedroto would also help lay the foundations for a continuously competitive team that could battle in equal terms against both domestic and foreign opponents. After a fruitless debut season, Pedroto put an end to the club's nine-year run without winning a trophy by securing its third Taça de Portugal in June 1968. The following season, Porto came close to win the league title, but compromising results in the last matches consigned the team to a runner-up finish, which led to Pedroto's resignation.
Similarly to the post-Guttmann years, Porto spent several seasons without winning a domestic title after Pedroto's resignation. During this period, the club hired several coaches with successful career records – Elek Schwartz, Tommy Docherty, Fernando Riera, Aymoré Moreira, and Branko Stanković – but neither delivered the long-awaited league title.

1976–88: Return of Pedroto and international success 

In the summer of 1976, Porto brought back Pedroto, who had just won back-to-back Taça de Portugal titles with city rivals Boavista. He ended the club's eight-year trophy drought by winning his third consecutive cup final, played at Porto's stadium. The following season, Pedroto overcame Benfica on goal difference to bring the championship title back to Porto, 19 years after having played in the club's last league-winning squad. That season, Pedroto also took the team to the quarter-finals of a European competition for the first time, after eliminating Manchester United from the Cup Winners' Cup. Porto won the 1978–79 Primeira Divisão, defending the league title for the first time since 1939–40. They were on the verge of an unprecedented third successive league triumph, but compromising results in the last matches surrendered the title to Sporting CP. Defeat in the cup final for the second year running contributed to the increasing unrest between Porto's president Américo de Sá and the team staff, which culminated in the resignation of Pedroto and the director of football Jorge Nuno Pinto da Costa. 

Austria's Hermann Stessl was the club's choice to succeed Pedroto; he lost the league and cup titles to Benfica in his first season, but defeated them in the first official edition of the domestic super cup, the Supertaça Cândido de Oliveira. On 23 April 1982, Pinto da Costa won the club's presidential election; one of his first decisions was to bring back Pedroto, who had been coaching Vitória de Guimarães. Despite his return, the club finished the 1982–83 season as runners-up to Benfica in the league and cup final. The latter result, however, allowed Porto to participate in the following season's Cup Winners' Cup, in which they reached their first-ever European final, losing 2–1 to Juventus. For this match, the team was led by assistant coach António Morais, who had been replacing a disease-stricken Pedroto since December 1983.

For the 1984–85 season, the club entrusted the head coach position to Artur Jorge, a former club player whose coaching career began as Pedroto's assistant in Guimarães. His first season was almost perfect, as he guided the team to their eighth league and third Supertaça titles, failing only against Benfica in the cup final. A second consecutive championship title in 1985–86 earned Artur Jorge's team an entry to the 1986–87 European Cup. Porto reached the tournament final, coming from behind to inflict European heavyweights Bayern Munich a surprising 2–1 defeat and lift their first international trophy. Artur Jorge left the club soon after this victory; to his place came Tomislav Ivić, a coach with club titles in Yugoslavia, the Netherlands, Belgium and Greece. Under Ivić, Porto achieved their second double and completed their international success by winning the European Super Cup and Intercontinental Cup.

1988–2002: Penta architects and engineers 
Like Artur Jorge, Ivić moved to France after guiding Porto through a successful season. His successor, Quinito, did not share the same fortune, resigning after eighteen matches, with six draws in eleven league matches and having lost the Supertaça. Porto brought back Artur Jorge but he could not salvage the season, which ended without a trophy for the first time in Pinto da Costa's presidency.  In the two seasons that followed, Artur Jorge won his third league title with Porto, one Taça de Portugal and one Supertaça.  His substitute, Brazilian coach Carlos Alberto Silva, held the job for two full seasons, during which the club secured back-to-back championships and one Supertaça, as well as the qualification for the first edition of the rebranded UEFA Champions League. Ivić returned five years after his first passage, but he could not emulate his previous success and was dismissed during the 1993–94 season winter break. 

Porto invited Bobby Robson, who had been sacked by league leaders Sporting CP. Under his leadership, Porto shortened the gap to the top of the league table, won the Taça de Portugal, and reached the Champions League semi-finals. In each of the following two seasons, the team won the league and the Supertaça (both times against Benfica), raising the  tally of wins over this opponent in the latter competition to seven out of eight meetings. During his last season in Porto, health problems forced Robson to fail many matches. During his absence, he was replaced by assistant coach and former Porto player, Augusto Inácio.

António Oliveira, a team captain in the late 1970s, was the club's choice to succeed Robson, who had left for Barcelona. Before signing for Porto, Oliveira had coached the Portugal national football team for two years, taking it to the UEFA Euro 1996 quarter-finals. Despite a bumpy start, Oliveira led Porto through a series of positive results that allowed the club to celebrate an unprecedented third consecutive league title. Meanwhile, the team lifted their ninth Supertaça after a historic 5–0 away win over Benfica. In the 1996–97 UEFA Champions League, Oliveira took the team to the quarter-finals, after winning their group ahead of Milan, whom they beat 3–2 at San Siro. The team's domestic performance was kept high during Oliveira's second season, as Porto secured their fourth straight league title and achieved a third double after beating Braga in the cup final.

Two days later, Oliveira resigned and his place was entrusted to Fernando Santos. He became known as the Engenheiro do Penta ("Penta Engineer") in reference to his engineering degree and for leading Porto to their fifth successive league title (Penta-campeonato or just Penta, in Portuguese), an unparalleled achievement in Portuguese football. In the following season, Santos lost the club's sixth straight league to Sporting CP, but defeated them in the cup final. In 2000–01, his last season in Porto, Santos defended the Taça de Portugal title, but failed to win the league for the second year running. He was succeeded by Octávio Machado, a former club player who had been Artur Jorge's assistant coach. Machado started off with a Supertaça win, but that would be Porto's only honour in a lackluster 2001–02 season, in which the team finished third in the league for the first time in 20 years. Machado was sacked after his team was eliminated from the Taça de Portugal and lost a league match for the sixth time.

2002–06: Resurgence and life after Mourinho 

In January 2002, Porto signed União de Leiria's coach José Mourinho, who returned to the club after his previous passage in Robson's staff. In his official presentation, Mourinho set the tone for the rest of his career in the club by stating that Porto would be crowned champions in the next season. Boosting new players mainly from other Portuguese clubs, the team fulfilled his promise by winning the 2002–03 Primeira Liga, eleven points ahead of runners-up Benfica. In Europe, Porto reached the 2003 UEFA Cup Final, where they beat Celtic 3–2 in extra-time to lift their first UEFA Cup trophy. As a result, Mourinho became the first Portuguese coach to win the Portuguese league and a European competition in the same season. Less than a month later, he guided the team to an unprecedented treble, after winning the Taça de Portugal final against his former club.
Mourinho's next season was also toasted with success. Despite losing the 2003 UEFA Super Cup to Milan and the Taça de Portugal to Benfica, his team won the Supertaça and defended their Primeira Liga title. The season's highlight was, however, the surprising campaign in the 2003–04 UEFA Champions League, which culminated with a 3–0 victory over Monaco in the final. A week later, Mourinho left the European champions and headed for London to sign with Chelsea.

The newfound European success struck a hard blow on the club's ambitions, as the departure of Mourinho and most of the team's influential players was not adequately compensated. In an atypical 2004–05 season, Porto had three coaches. Italian coach Luigi Delneri never led the team in an official match, as he was sacked before the start of the season. Víctor Fernández, a Cup Winners' Cup victor in 1995, commanded Porto to victories in the Supertaça and 2004 Intercontinental Cup, but lost the 2004 UEFA Super Cup and was eliminated early from the Taça de Portugal. After a home loss in the league, the Spaniard was sacked and José Couceiro was given the position until the end of the season.

Dutchman Co Adriaanse was brought in for the 2005–06 season with the goal of taking back the league title, in Benfica's possession. Adriaanse accomplished not only this objective – employing a daring 3–4–3 formation during most of the season – but also secured the club's 13th Taça de Portugal title and fifth double. In contrast, the team performed poorly in the Champions League, failing to advance from the group stage and being eliminated altogether from European competitions. During the 2006–07 pre-season, Adriaanse resigned; his position was temporarily assumed by his assistant and home-grown club legend, Rui Barros. His only official match as caretaker coach coincided with the season-opening Supertaça, which Porto won for the 15th time.

2006–11: Ferreira and Villas-Boas years 
Adriaanse's successor, Jesualdo Ferreira, took advantage of the tactical work implemented by the Dutchman and led Porto to a second successive league title, decided by a single point in a frantic final matchday. Ferreira won the Primeira Liga in the following two seasons, becoming the first Portuguese coach to win three consecutive Portuguese championships.  In the latter season, Ferreira lost the Supertaça and access to the 2008–09 Taça da Liga final, but his team went on to lift the Taça de Portugal, securing Porto's sixth double. In Europe, after two seasons of being eliminated in the first knockout round, Ferreira took Porto to the 2008–09 Champions League quarter-finals, where they lost against holders Manchester United. The Portuguese coach opened the 2009–10 season with his first Supertaça triumph and closed it by defending the Taça de Portugal title against relegated second-tier Chaves. In between, he failed to secure the club's second Penta – finishing third, outside the Champions League qualifying places – and lost the Taça da Liga final. In his last European campaign with Porto, Ferreira guided the team to the last 16 for the fourth year running, but they were eliminated by Arsenal after a 5–0 loss in London. 

On 26 May 2010, Ferreira resigned; a week later, Porto announced Académica de Coimbra's coach André Villas-Boas as his successor. Villas-Boas had previously worked with Mourinho in Porto, Chelsea and Inter Milan, before leaving him in 2009 to begin a coaching career in Académica de Coimbra. In his first match with Porto, his team faced Benfica for the Supertaça; Porto won 2–0 and Villas-Boas claimed his first career title, becoming the youngest coach to win a Portuguese competition. In the league, he led a team spearheaded by players such as Radamel Falcao and Hulk through a highly successful campaign that assured the title with five matches to spare, after beating defending champions Benfica at their ground. Under Villas-Boas, Porto finished the league season undefeated (27 wins and 3 draws) for the first time in its history.  In addition, he broke other club records: distance between league winners and runners-up (21 points), most consecutive league wins (16) and highest percentage of points in a 30-game season (93.33%).

That season, Porto returned to UEFA's second club competition, renamed UEFA Europa League, eight years after their triumph in Seville. Starting in the play-off round, Villas-Boas's team reached the decisive match in Dublin, where they won the club's seventh international title in an all-Portuguese face-off against Braga. In doing so, Villas-Boas became the youngest coach to win a European club competition.  The club's third consecutive triumph in the Taça de Portugal raised Villas-Boas's season trophy tally to four – matching Ivić's 1987–88 season – and allowed Porto to surpass Benfica in total number of titles (69 versus 68). Only Porto's early exit from the 2010–11 Taça da Liga prevented a complete domestic title sweep.  Villas-Boas's short but highly prized career in Porto sparked the interest of Chelsea, who paid a record £13.3 million to release him from his contract with Porto and sign him as their new coach.

Recent years 

Porto found in Villas-Boas' assistant Vitor Pereira their new head coach. Although getting off to a winning start, by taking the 2011 Supertaça Cândido de Oliveira,  Pereira's Porto disappointed in most of the other competitions. In the Champions League group stage, the team finished third and was relegated to the Europa League.  Able to defend their title, Porto fell immediately in the first round against Manchester City.  Domestically, they were eliminated from the Taça de Portugal in the round of 32, and lost in the league cup semifinals. Inconsistent performances throughout the season threatened Porto's title defence, but positive results against direct opponents allowed the club to win the 2011–12 Primeira Liga with two games to spare.

Pereira won a second consecutive league and supercup in 2012–13, then left for Al-Ahli in Saudi Arabia. He was succeeded by Paulo Fonseca, who had just taken F.C. Paços de Ferreira into the Champions League for the first time. Fonseca began his reign with victory in the 2013 Supertaça Cândido de Oliveira but was sacked in March 2014 after a poor run of results; reserve manager Luís Castro served as interim manager until the end of the season.

In May 2014, Spain under-21 coach Julen Lopetegui was hired as Porto's first foreign manager since 2006. After 18 trophyless months in charge, he became just the eighth coach in their history to be dismissed during a season, with the team lying in third. Reserve manager Rui Barros filled the gap before the appointment of José Peseiro, who left in May 2016 to be replaced by former Porto goalkeeper Nuno Espírito Santo. He did not win an honour during his one season at the club, and left by mutual accord.

Another former Porto player, Sérgio Conceição, was hired in June 2017. His team won the 2017–18 Primeira Liga, the club's first honour for five years.

Managers 
Only first-team competitive matches are counted. Wins, losses and draws are results at the final whistle; the results of penalty shoot-outs are not counted.
Statistics are updated up to 4 March 2023.

Key
P = matches played; W = matches won; D = matches drawn; L = matches lost; GF = goals for; GA = goals against; Win % = percentage of total matches won
 = Player-coach;  = Caretaker manager
n/a = information not available

Notes

References 
Bibliography

Citations

FC Porto managers
Porto
Managers